Gent Hawks, for sponsorship reasons Wanty Gent Hawks, is a Belgian professional basketball club that is located in the Gent area of the Province of East-Flanders, Belgium. The club competes in the second basketball division in Belgium. The team was founded in 1950. The team plays home games at the 2,374 seat Tolhuis. The club has played in the Belgian highest division since 2007. The season before, they became champion in the second division.

Names

Season by season

Honors and titles

Domestic competitions
Belgian League: 
Champions (1): 1955
Belgian Cup: 
Winners (1): 1992
Belgian 2nd Division: 
Champions (2): 2007, 2017

European competitions
 1991–92 FIBA Korać Cup: Second Round

External links 

Basketball teams in Belgium
Sport in Ghent